Ayanfuri is a mining town in the Central Region of Ghana. The town is the termination town on the  Tarkwa-Bogoso-Ayamfuri road.

References

Populated places in the Central Region (Ghana)